Mark Julian Felder (born July 21, 1983), more commonly known under simply Bizzle, is an American Christian hip hop recording artist and entrepreneur.

In January 2010, Bizzle released "You Got Some Explaining to Do" directed towards Jay-Z, calling the rap icon out on his negative references towards Jesus and Christianity in his music. The video caused much controversy and generated a buzz that even Bizzle couldn't anticipate. He released a statement in an interview with AllHipHop.com.

He released his first mixtape, The Messenger, in March 2010. Shortly after the release, he founded God Over Money Records in Houston, Texas. Since its creation, the label has released eight mixtapes, a collaborative album with artist Willie 'P-Dub' Moore Jr., three full-length studio albums, and signed two artists.

Bizzle released his debut album, Tough Love & Parables, on June 21, 2011 which debuted at No. 15 on the Billboard Gospel Albums chart. It appeared on the iTunes Store swoosh= banner. The Good Fight was released on May 7, 2013 and debuted at No. 2 on Billboard'''s Gospel Albums chart, No. 7 on Christian Albums, No. 11 on Top Rap Albums, and sold a total of 3,962 copies in its first week.

Bizzle received nominations for Rap/Hip Hop Gospel CD of The Year at both the 2012 & 2014 Stellar Awards, sharing the category with artists Derek Minor, Lecrae, and Thi'sl. He also received three nominations at the 2012 & 2013 Kingdom Choice Awards and although he didn't win any in 2012, he won all three categories in 2013 for Rap Single of The Year, Hip Hop Album of The Year, and Music Video of The Year.

Bizzle caused a commotion in the media when he released Same Love: A Response, the artist's reaction to a controversial wedding ceremony broadcast during the 56th Annual Grammy Awards. As expected, the response track received a lot of media attention. Due to the extremely angry response Felder received, he created a website to draw attention to the apparent lack of tolerance toward Christians and their differing views on the definition of marriage.

Life and career

Early life
Mark Felder was raised mostly by his mother in Los Angeles, California. His father stayed in Compton, California. As a child growing up, his family was quite poor living in Section 8 housing.

Mark was around thirteen the first time he stepped in a music studio. Listening to Tupac, he began to establish a talent for writing rhymes but noticed that his content usually mimicked those he listened to, whether it was his uncle or other rappers. Topics like shooting or packing pistols.

After graduating, Mark put out five mixtapes and began circulating them in malls, clubs, radio stations and anywhere else he could. He eventually got an opportunity to open up for Lil Wayne & Juelz Santana during their I Can't Feel My Face tour. He also opened up for Lil Boosie.

While trying to move his music, his financial situation got worse. As he stated in an interview, his "financial situation got so bad he was sleeping on a friend's floor and his car was a closet for his clothes." Mark began selling drugs and even became a pimp to fund his music career and to maintain a certain image around those he aspired to become like in the industry.

2004–08 L.A.V. Mixtapes
Between the years 2004–2008 Bizzle released L.A.V. Mixtapes Volumes 1–5 in Southern California. He then released Dirty West Mixtapes 1 and 2 with J. Sin and 360 Records in Houston, Texas, and returned to California to release, Certified Mixtape'.

In 2005 he was offered a deal by 360 Records out of Houston and declined. Two years later, Bizzle had been offered a deal by Barry Hankerson to sign with Blackground/Universal, but he also declined that offer.

Bizzle spent three years preparing his debut album Grind Pays. Multiple singles where spread causing his Myspace plays to increase over 500,000.

Conversion to Christianity

Not long after, Mark established the God Over Money Records recording label and began making music with a different purpose.

2008–11 The Jay-Z diss, The Messenger trilogy & Tough Love & Parables

The influence of his Christianity and Mark's exposure to the dark side of hip hop ultimately prompted his questioning of the dark imagery that appears to be promoted through the music of rappers like Kanye West, Rick Ross, and Jay-Z. On January 17, 2010 he released the track "You Got Some Explaining to Do", a song directed towards Jay-Z, exposing him for his negative references towards Jesus in his lyrics. The result of the diss song led Bizzle to being called the "Christian Rapper that dissed Jay Z". Overwhelmed by the positive response and media attention he received, Mark decided to set out making music that both proclaimed the Gospel of the Bible as truth and exposes the evil working within the music industry.

He released his first Christian mixtape, The Messenger, on March 30, 2010 on DatPiff. The mixtape received much success and has been downloaded over 1 million times since its release. The Messenger 2: Delivered & The Messenger 3: Truth Music followed in 2010 & 2011 respectively.

On June 21, 2011, Felder released his first full-length studio album titled Tough Love & Parables.

2012–14 BoBW, The Good Fight and working with Boi-1da

On February 7, 2012 Felder and Willie Moore, Jr. released Best of Both Worlds: The Album. They hit No. 5 spot on the iTunes Hip Hop/Rap Chart on their debut.

On May 7, 2013, Bizzle released his second studio album The Good Fight. The album features production-works from Grammy-winning producer Boi-1da.'Bizzle Reveals The Good Fight Tracklist And Production Credits'. Wade-O Radio. 2013. http://wadeoradio.com/bizzle-reveals-the-good-fight-track-list-and-production-credits/  Originally set for an April 26, 2013 release, it was pushed-back to a later date. Its first single, "Soldier" was released January 26, 2013 and features No Malice and included a music video. Later singles were "Dear Hip-Hop" and "My Confession" (featuring Sevin). The album debuted on the Billboard Top Rap Albums at No. 11. His previous works with Boi-1da include "Forgive Me" released on March 16, 2011 which features rapper MC Jin and "Lost and Found" on his collaborative mixtape Martyrs in the Making with Bumps INF.

Bizzle stated that Boi-1da reached out to him on YouTube stating his personal beliefs in Christianity and respect for Bizzle's work and worked free of charge. The collaborative work between the two was highlighted in the 2012 September edition of XXL.

 "Same Love" controversy 
On January 28, 2014, Bizzle released a single entitled "Same Love (A Response)" that takes its cue from the pro-gay rights single "Same Love" by Macklemore and Ryan Lewis. It opens with the rapper reciting a quotation from the Book of Timothy then leads into the same instrumental track as Macklemore's original.
 The song is critical of the media in its promotion of homosexuality, stating that it is hypocritical to call for tolerance for same-sex relationships while at the same time branding opponents of them as "hateful". He also takes offense at the analogy of gay rights with the civil rights struggle of blacks, He also encourages Christians who struggle with homosexuality to "fight the good fight".

Three days after its release, the song garnered over 30,000 views on YouTube.  The Huffington Post called the track "very disturbing". The Advocate, a newspaper that represents the LGBTQ+ community, said Bizzle's single "uses the instrumental hook from Macklemore's 'Same Love' to say that LGBT people are sinful, violent, and just like pedophiles." Bizzle has reported that he has received death threats because of the song, created a website that chronicles the backlash against him, and maintains that he is not homophobic but simply stating an opposing argument to that in popular media.

Justin Bieber Instagram handle controversy

On February 11, 2014, US Magazine reported that Justin Bieber had changed his Instagram handle to 'bizzle' citing that "the moniker ‘Bizzle’ actually belongs to a Christian rapper based in L.A."

Personal life

Felder was born and raised in Los Angeles. After 18 years of recording in Los Angeles, Bizzle relocated to Houston, Texas, where he currently lives with his wife and two children.

Discography

Albums
2011: Tough Love & Parables2012: Best of Both Worlds: The Album (with Willie 'P-Dub' Moore Jr.)
2013: The Good Fight2014: Well Wishes2015: Surrender2016:  Crowns and Crosses2018: Light Work (EP)
2019: Light Work 2: Bars & Melodies2020: The Messenger 42021: Soul Therapy (EP)

Mixtapes
2010: The Messenger2010: The Messenger 2: Delivered2010: Best of Both Worlds: The Mixtape2011: The Messenger 3: Truth Music2012: Martyrs In the Making (Bizzle and Bumps INF)
2013: Martyrs In the Making 2 (Bizzle, Bumps INF, Flo and Selah the Corner)

Additional label releases
2010: Who is Mark James? (Bumps INF mixtape project)
2011: Who is Mark James 2? (Bumps INF re-release)
2012: Pain in Paragraphs'' (Bumps INF debut album)

See also
 Andy Mineo

References

External links
 

1983 births
African-American Christians
African-American male rappers
American male rappers
African-American poets
African-American record producers
American evangelicals
American hip hop record producers
Living people
American performers of Christian hip hop music
Rappers from Houston
Songwriters from Texas
West Coast hip hop musicians
Southern hip hop musicians
21st-century American rappers
21st-century American poets
Record producers from Texas
21st-century American male musicians
African-American songwriters
21st-century African-American writers
20th-century African-American people
American male songwriters